CS Chebba is a Tunisian football team, competing in the 2019–20 Tunisian Ligue Professionnelle 1, from Chebba in Tunisia.

History
It was founded in 1960 in Chebba in the Sahel region of Tunisia. In 1999 the club made his debut in the Tunisian Cup, managing to advance to the round of 32, being eliminated by AS Gabès.

In 2015 it made his debut in the Tunisian Ligue Professionnelle 3 where it was 4th in the southern group until 2017.

In the same year it made his debut in Tunisian Ligue Professionnelle 2 until 2019, winning group B, achieving promotion to Tunisian Ligue Professionnelle 1 for the 2019–20 season for the first time in its history.

In his first season it finished in 8th place as the best position in his history. In the same season, it managed to reach the semifinals of the Tunisian cup by facing Espérance de Tunis, being eliminated by a score of 2–0.

In de 2021-22 season the club relegated but the club appealed the decision at the Court of Arbitration for Sport, The Court decided the reinstatement of Club Croissant Sportif Chebbien in Ligue 1 of the championship for the 2022-2023 season.

Players
As of 23 November, 2021

Managers
  Mohamed Mkacher (2015–2018)
  Ezzedine Khemila (2018)
  Chokri Béjaoui (2018)
  Maher Guizani (2018–2019)
  Victor Zvunka (2019)
  Bertrand Marchand (2019–2022)
  Kais Yâakoubi (2022)
  Ezzaki Badou (2022–present)

Presidents
  Ali Ayed (2013–2015)
  	Taoufik Mkacher (2015–present)

References

Football clubs in Tunisia